Haji biryani (also known as Hajir biryani) is one of the oldest restaurants in the heart of Old Dhaka, Bangladesh, selling chevon biryani (dish made with highly seasoned rice and goat's meat). The restaurant also sells borhani (a salted mint drink made of yogurt) and soft drinks. In 1939 the restaurant was started as a roadside food corner by a person named Haji Mohammad Hossain. Later on the business took dramatic change and became part of the culture of Dhaka city.

History
The business was started on 1939 by a cook of Hadhrami Arab descent named Haji Mohammad Hossain. After Haji Mohammad Hossain died in 1992, his son, Haji Mohammad Golam Hossain took over and continued the family business without making any changes in style and tradition. By the passage of time Haji Mohammad Golam became tired by running the family business and finally handed over the business to his son, Haji Mohammad Shahed. The dish bears resemblance to the Yemeni Haneeth.

Location
The Haji biryani has three branches. One is in Old Dhaka which is the main branch, one is in Motijheel,  In Old Dhaka, it is located at 70 Kazi Alauddin Road, Nazira Bazar.

Recipe
The recipe includes highly seasoned rice, chevon, mustard oil, garlic, onion, black pepper, saffron, clove, cardamom, cinnamon, salt, lemon, doi (yogurt), peanuts, cream, raisin and small amount of cheese (either cow or buffalo). The recipe has been handed over the founder of the restaurant to his next generation. Haji Mohammad Shahed claimed that, “I have never changed anything, not even the amount of salt”.

See also
Madhur Canteen
Star Kabab

References

Further reading

External links
 

Old Dhaka
Restaurants in Dhaka
Restaurants in Bangladesh
Bangladeshi cuisine
 
Bangladeshi
Bangladeshi culture